Dillo is a minimalistic web browser particularly intended for older or slower computers and embedded systems. It supports only plain HTML/XHTML (with CSS rendering) and images over HTTP; scripting is ignored entirely. Current versions of Dillo can run on Linux, BSD, OS X, IRIX and Cygwin. Due to its small size, it is the browser of choice in several space-conscious Linux distributions. Released under the GNU GPL-3.0-or-later, Dillo is free software.

Chilean software engineer Jorge Arellano Cid conceived the Dillo project in late 1999, publishing the first version of Dillo in December of that year. His primary goal in creating Dillo was to democratize access to information. Arellano Cid believed that no one should have to buy a new computer or pay for broadband in order to enjoy the World Wide Web. To this end, he designed Dillo to be small, fast, and efficient, capable of performing well even on an Intel 80486 CPU with a dial-up Internet access.

Development
Dillo was originally written in the C programming language with the GTK+ GUI toolkit. The first versions were based on an earlier browser called Armadillo, hence the name. Dillo 2, written with both C and C++ components and the Fast Light Toolkit (FLTK), was released on October 14, 2008. Text antialiasing, support for character sets other than Latin-1, HTTP compression capability, and improved page rendering were all added. The move to FLTK from GTK+ also removed many of the project's dependencies and reduced Dillo's memory footprint by 50%.

In 2011, Dillo-3.x was released, using FLTK-1.3. According to the Changelog, this change was prompted in part by the lack of an official release of FLTK-2, which stopped Dillo-2's inclusion in lightweight distributions for which it would otherwise have been suitable.

Jorge Arellano Cid is still Dillo's lead developer today. Dillo is funded by private donations; efforts to obtain public grants and corporate sponsors have been unsuccessful. Lack of funding led to a slowdown in development in 2006, and a complete stop in 2007. The project restarted again in 2008 and two months later received a 115 € donation from DistroWatch.

Features
Features of Dillo include bookmarks, tabbed browsing, and support for JPEG, PNG (including alpha transparency), and GIF images. Partial support for CSS was introduced in release 2.1. Settings such as the default fonts, background color, downloads folder, and home page are customizable through configuration files. Cookies are supported but disabled by default due to privacy concerns. While most web browsers retain the web cache and history after the program is closed, Dillo automatically clears them to improve both privacy and performance.

A developer tool called the "bug meter" is provided in the lower-right corner. When clicked, it displays information about validation problems, such as unclosed tags, that Dillo found in the web page. Unlike most browsers, Dillo does not have a quirks mode to improve compatibility with web pages that use invalid HTML. Instead, Dillo processes all web pages according to the published web standards.

In 2003, two Linux enthusiasts successfully ran Dillo on an Intel 486 processor and demonstrated that even with such meager hardware, Dillo could render http://news.bbc.co.uk/ in 10–15 seconds. Furthermore, Dillo can run on a variety of software platforms, including Linux, BSD, Solaris, Mac OS X, DOS, and some handheld devices. However, Dillo's developers have made little effort to make the browser work on Microsoft Windows. Arellano Cid stated that Windows goes against Dillo's goal of democratization by artificially increasing hardware requirements and software costs. Nevertheless, Dillo has been reported to work on Windows via Cygwin.  Additionally, Dillo-Win32 was a project to port Dillo to Windows which is now defunct.
D+ browser or Dplus continues where Dillo-Win32 left off, it's forked from the final Dillo-Win32 release (3.0p9) and does not attempt to maintain upstream compatibility with Dillo. Last version is 0.5b (Oct 15, 2013).

Dillo does not support JavaScript, Java, Flash, right-to-left text, or complex text layout. Support for frames is also very limited; Dillo presents a link to each frame to allow the user to view them one at a time. A plug-in to add HTTPS support is likewise under development.

Reception
Reviews of Dillo have praised its extraordinary speed, but noted that this speed comes at a price. The most visible cost is Dillo's inability to display complex web pages as they were meant to be. A 2008 review by Linux.com commented that Dillo's user interface may be "intimidating" for new users, and pointed out the scarcity of plug-ins for Dillo. In all, Dillo's global usage share is less than one hundredth of one percent.

Dillo is, however, the browser of choice in several space-conscious Linux distributions, such as Damn Small Linux, Feather Linux, VectorLinux, antiX and Mustang Linux.

See also

 Comparison of lightweight web browsers
 Comparison of web browsers
 List of web browsers
 List of web browsers for Unix and Unix-like operating systems

References

External links

 
 

POSIX web browsers
MacOS web browsers
Web browsers for DOS
Free web browsers
Embedded Linux
Free software programmed in C
Cross-platform free software
RISC OS web browsers
Software that uses FLTK
1999 software